Cronobacter dublinensis is a bacterium. Its name pertains to Dublin, the origin of the type strain. The type strain is originally from a milk powder manufacturing facility (LMG 23823T =DSMZ 18705T). C. dublinensis sp. nov. is dulcitol negative and methyl-α-D-glucopyranoside positive and generally positive for indole production.

References

Further reading

External links
LPSN

Type strain of Cronobacter dublinensis subsp. dublinensis at BacDive -  the Bacterial Diversity Metadatabase
Type strain of Cronobacter dublinensis subsp. lactaridi at BacDive -  the Bacterial Diversity Metadatabase
Type strain of Cronobacter dublinensis subsp. lausannensis at BacDive -  the Bacterial Diversity Metadatabase

Enterobacteriaceae
Bacteria described in 2007